Ulvøya is an island in the municipality of Hitra in Trøndelag county, Norway. The  island is located just north of Fjellværsøya island. The Knarrlagsundet bridge connects the two islands. The island is home to the villages of Knarrlagsund and Ulvan. Marine Harvest has a fish processing plant in Ulvan.

See also
List of islands of Norway

References

Islands of Trøndelag
Hitra